Bodil may refer to:

 Bodil Awards, Danish film awards
 Bodil (given name), a feminine given name
 Cyclone Bodil, a 2013 winter storm that affected northern Europe
 3459 Bodil, an asteroid